The Lubny Regiment was one of ten territorial-administrative subdivisions of the Cossack Hetmanate. The regiment's capital was the city of Lubny, now in Poltava Oblast of central Ukraine. Other major cities of the regiment were Pyriatyn, Hlynsk and Romny.

The Lubny Regiment was founded in 1649, and was combined with the Myrhorod Regiment in 1658. During combination, 7 sotnias from the Myrhorod Regiment, 4 from the Kropyvna Regiment, and 2 from the Poltava Regiment were added into the Lubny Regiment. After reformation, the regiment consisted of a total of 13 sotnias, and later on in the 18th century — of 23 sotnias.

According to documents of 1723, the regiment consisted of 2,687 land cossacks, and 3,968 horseback cossacks. In 1781, the regiment was officially abolished, and its territory was reformed into the Kiev and Chernigov Governorates.

References
 lubny.info — 8th Lubny Husar Regiment

Cossack Hetmanate Regiments
History of Poltava Oblast
1649 establishments in the Polish–Lithuanian Commonwealth
Military units and formations established in 1649